Kambalakkad Juma Mosque, is one of the most important and biggest juma masjid in Wayanad district. It is under issathul islam sangam kambalakkad. ([[Samastha Kerala Jem-iyyathul Ulama (1989–present)
|samastha]])

Kambalakkad 
Kambalakkad is one of the small towns in Vythiri taluk, Wayanad district, Kerala, India.

References

 https://www.deshabhimani.com/news/kerala/latest-news/488485

Mosques in Kerala
Mananthavady Area
Religious buildings and structures in Wayanad district